Nymphaster is a genus of echinoderms belonging to the family Goniasteridae.

The genus has almost cosmopolitan distribution.

Species:

Nymphaster alcocki 
Nymphaster arenatus 
Nymphaster arthrocnemis 
Nymphaster atopus 
Nymphaster coombii 
Nymphaster diomedeae 
Nymphaster dolmeni 
Nymphaster dyscritus 
Nymphaster euryplax 
Nymphaster fontis 
Nymphaster gardineri 
Nymphaster habrotatus 
Nymphaster leptodomus 
Nymphaster magistrorum 
Nymphaster marginatus 
Nymphaster meseres 
Nymphaster miocenicus 
Nymphaster moebii 
Nymphaster moluccanus 
Nymphaster mucronatus 
Nymphaster nora 
Nymphaster obtusus 
Nymphaster peakei 
Nymphaster pentagonus 
Nymphaster robustus 
Nymphaster tethysiensis

References

Goniasteridae